The 2004 Tour was a concert tour by Elton John that took place in 2004 covering three continents, fourteen countries and twenty-nine cities.

Tour
Elton John and his band set out on tour on 13 February 2004. Elton held the second ever residency at The Colosseum at Caesars Palace while Céline Dion was continuing her A New Day... residency. The show was called 'The Red Piano' because of the prominent red piano that Elton played on stage. The idea for the show originated in 2004 by Elton John and David LaChapelle. The Red Piano was originally scheduled to be 75 shows over three years. John ended his residency at the Colosseum on 22 April 2009. Elton eventually performed two-hundred and forty-three shows.

Elton and the band then went on to tour the United States and Elton then went in to perform several shows in Europe after which Elton went on to tour Europe with rest of his band.

Elton the performed five shows with the Royal Academy of Music in the United Kingdom. After which he traveling to the United States to perform a further five shows at Radio City Music Hall with the New York Philharmonic Orchestra.

Elton and the band then went to perform their first show in Gibraltar and went on to perform in China, South Korea and Taiwan.

Tour dates

Festivals and other miscellaneous performances

Setlist

References

External links

 Information Site with Tour Dates

Elton John concert tours
2004 concert tours